MNC News is an Indonesian flagship news programme which broadcast on MNC News, 

The program is broadcast in the morning (as MNC News Morning), noon (as MNC News Today), afternoon (as MNC News Now), evening (as MNC News Prime), night (as MMNC News Tonight)

See also 

 Seputar iNews
 Buletin iNews
 Lintas iNews

References

External links 

  Official Site
  MNC News site

Indonesian television news shows
Indonesian-language television shows
2021 Indonesian television series debuts
2020s Indonesian television series
MNC News original programming